Regina Burchardt (born 1 July 1983) is a German female former volleyball player, playing as a right side hitter. She was part of the Germany women's national volleyball team.

She competed at the 2011 Women's European Volleyball Championship. On club level she played for VC Wiesbaden.

References

External links

1983 births
Living people
German women's volleyball players
Place of birth missing (living people)
21st-century German women
20th-century German women